John King was a Michigan politician.

In 1839, King served as a justice of the peace in Northfield Township, Michigan alongside Rufus Matthews, Alvin Moe, and Nathan Sutton. In 1842, King served as treasurer of Northfield Township. On November 7, 1842, King was elected to the Michigan House of Representatives where he represented the Washtenaw County district from January 2, 1843 to March 9, 1843. During his term in the legislature, he served on the Banks and Incorporations committee.

References

Year of birth missing
Year of death missing
American justices of the peace
City and town treasurers in the United States
Members of the Michigan House of Representatives
People from Washtenaw County, Michigan
19th-century American judges
19th-century American politicians